Alan Aboud (born 13 May 1966) is an Irish graphic designer and creative director, from Dublin, Ireland. He was educated at Belvedere College, Dublin from 1974–1984 and the National College of Art & Design (NCAD), Dublin where he completed his foundation year and began his degree in graphic design before transferring to Saint Martin's School of Art in London in 1986. He graduated from there in 1989, with a first class honours degree.

Life and career

He founded the creative agency Aboud Sodano in 1989 with fellow Saint Martin's student and photographer Sandro Sodano.

The pair enjoyed a loose creative association for many years combining Alan's talent for art direction and typography with Sandro's distinctive image making. In 2007, Aboud Sodano became Aboud Creative, when their full-time collaboration ceased.

For over 20 years, the agency worked extensively with strong and creatively innovative fashion, beauty, fragrance and lifestyle brands including Paul Smith (Sir Paul Smith), Levi's, H&M, River Island and Neal's Yard Remedies.

Aboud created the Paul Smith identity using a Multi-stripe textile design originally created for shirting in 1997. Spotted at his degree show by Paul Smith's head buyer in 1989, he began working for Smith two days a week on his advertising and graphic design whilst setting up Aboud Sodano - his working relationship with Smith flourished and continued uninterrupted until June 2015. He continues to work on advertising for PAUL SMITH COLLECTION, the company's Japanese higher line.

He has rebranded his agency to ABOUD+ABOUD, reflecting his move into creative consultancy for agencies such as GREY LONDON, where he collaborates with them on brands such as HUGO BOSS fragrances. The agency also continues to work on editorial design, fashion advertising and more recently Creative Direction for fashion short form films.

Aboud has three children, twins Milo and Victor Keating-Aboud, and a daughter, Georgie Alma Best Aboud.

Quote

"I really don't think that my vision of the future of graphic design is that relevant or indeed important. Every aspiring designer should stick to his or her beliefs. What I do care about in my work is that it is original, appropriate, and never patronising. My long-term goal is to achieve a healthy and equal balance between design that works strategically but doesn't pollute the environment and design that creatively pushes boundaries, whether they be aesthetic or about choice of medium. I would ideally like to use the skills that I have as a designer to take on board some social responsibility as I am actually aware that it is designers of my generation and the one previous that are responsible for the saturation of the High Street with ubiquitous and meaningless design."

Reference material

1. you can find inspiration in everything* Paul Smith Published by Violette Editions  Contributor's p. 296

2. New Design London: The Edge of Graphic Design Edited by Edward M. Gomez Published by Rockport Publishers, Inc.  p. 16

3. The Graphics Book Edited by Jane Austin Published by RotoVision SA   p. 13

4. Graphics - Real-world graphic design projects - from brief to finished solution Published by Rotovision  p. 12 - p. 19

5. Graphic Design for the 21st Century 100 of the World's Graphic Designer Published by Taschen  p. 38 - p. 43

6. Wear Me: Fashion + Graphics Interaction Edited by Liz Farelly  p. 144 - p. 153

7. Great Graphics on a Budget Written and Designed by Simon Dixon and Aporva Baxi Published by Rockport Publishers  p. 96 - p. 99

8. Fashion & Graphics Written by Tamsin Blanchard Published by Laurence King Publishing  p. 128 - p. 139

9. Problem Solved Written by Michael Johnson Published by Phaidon Press  p. 257

10. Communicate: Independent Graphic Design since the Sixties Edited by Rick Poynor Published by Laurence King Publishing  p. 88

11. Dialogue Relationships in Graphic Design Written by Shaun Cole Published by V&A Publications  p. 30 - p. 39

References

External links

1. Aboud + Aboud website 

Irish graphic designers
Irish designers
People educated at Belvedere College
1966 births
20th-century Irish people
21st-century Irish people
Living people
Alumni of the National College of Art and Design
Alumni of Saint Martin's School of Art